Portage Township is the name of some places in the U.S. state of Pennsylvania:

Portage Township, Cambria County, Pennsylvania
Portage Township, Cameron County, Pennsylvania
Portage Township, Potter County, Pennsylvania

Pennsylvania township disambiguation pages